USS Spicewood (AN-53/YN-72) was an  which served with the U.S. Navy in the South Pacific Ocean theatre of operations during World War II.  Her career was without major incident, and she returned home after the war bearing one battle star to her credit.

Launched at Stockton, California
Spicewood was laid down as YN-72 on 25 May 1943 at Stockton, California, by the Pollock-Stockton Shipbuilding Company; redesignated AN-53 on 20 January 1944; launched on 6 December 1943; and commissioned on 7 April 1944.

World War II service
The net layer completed shakedown training and post-shakedown availability by 19 June and towed fuel barge YO-92 from San Pedro, California, to Hawaii, arriving at Pearl Harbor on the 29th. There she was assigned to the 14th Naval District and relieved the Coast Guard tug Balsam (WAGL-62) at the Phoenix Islands, located east of the Gilbert and Ellice groups. Spicewood remained in that group of small atolls until late in the year.

She returned to Pearl Harbor on 4 December. On 14 February 1945, she sailed for Eniwetok, Ulithi, and Leyte. By mid-April, she was at Okinawa as an element of Task Force 51. There she operated with Task Group 52.8, the Net and Buoy Group, at Kerama Retto.

End-of-war activity
Hostilities ceased in the western Pacific Ocean on 15 August, but Spicewood remained at Okinawa until late October. She headed for Pearl Harbor on the 29th and reached her destination on 17 November. After a week at Oahu, she continued east and made San Diego, California, on 4 December.

Post-war decommissioning
She sailed from there to San Pedro, California, between 6 and 7 December and was decommissioned on 20 February 1946. Her name was struck from the Navy List on 12 March 1946, and her hulk was sold on 18 April 1947 to the Van Camp Seafood Company, Terminal Island, California.

Honors and awards
Spicewood (AN-53) earned one battle star during World War II.

References
 
 NavSource Online: Service Ship Photo Archive - YN-72 / AN-53 Spicewood

 

Ailanthus-class net laying ships of the United States Navy
Ships built in Stockton, California
1943 ships
World War II net laying ships of the United States